"Somethin Tells Me" is a song by American singer Bryson Tiller. It was released on May 11, 2017, as the first single from his second studio album, True to Self (2017). Tiller co-wrote the song with its producer T-Minus.

Music video
The music video for the song, directed by Elijah Steen, premiered via Tiller's Vevo channel on May 25, 2017. The video features Tiller playing the role of a photographer, taking photos of models on a beach before returning to the dark room to examine his work. After he’s finished looking at each new picture, he posts it on the dark room wall before gazing at his gallery.

Charts

Certifications

References

External links

2017 songs
2017 singles
RCA Records singles
Bryson Tiller songs
Songs written by T-Minus (record producer)
Song recordings produced by T-Minus (record producer)
Songs written by Bryson Tiller